Monomethyl auristatin E (MMAE) is a synthetic antineoplastic agent. Because of its toxicity, it cannot be used as a drug itself; instead, it is linked to a monoclonal antibody (MAB) which directs it to the cancer cells. In International Nonproprietary Names for MMAE-MAB-conjugates, the name vedotin refers to MMAE plus its linking structure to the antibody. It is a potent antimitotic drug derived from peptides occurring in marine shell-less mollusc Dolabella auricularia called dolastatins which show potent activity in preclinical studies, both in vitro and in vivo, against a range of lymphomas, leukemia and solid tumors. These drugs show potency of up to 200 times that of vinblastine, another antimitotic drug used for Hodgkin lymphoma as well as other types of cancer.

MMAE is actually desmethyl-auristatin E; that is, the N-terminal amino group has only one methyl substituent instead of two as in auristatin E itself.

Mechanism of action
Monomethyl auristatin E is an antimitotic agent which inhibits cell division by blocking the polymerisation of tubulin. The linker to the monoclonal antibody is stable in extracellular fluid, but is cleaved by cathepsin once the conjugate has entered a tumor cell, thus activating the antimitotic mechanism.

Monoclonal antibodies/ADCs
MMAE has been tested with various monoclonal antibodies (usually forming an antibody-drug conjugate).
targeting the protein CD30 which is found on malignant cells in anaplastic large cell lymphoma and Hodgkin's lymphoma:
Brentuximab (cAC10), 3–5 units of MMAE per molecule
targeting the glycoprotein GPNMB which is found in aggressive melanoma, glioma, breast cancer and other tumours:
Glembatumumab (CR011, CDX-011), investigated for the treatment of breast cancer and melanoma
 targeting CD37: 
 AGS67E, to treat lymphoid malignancy
 targeting tissue factor in recurrent or persistent cervical cancers that progress on or after first line chemotherapy regimens:
 tisotumab vedotin

Examples:
 Sofituzumab vedotin
 Polatuzumab vedotin (RG7596)
 Enfortumab vedotin
 Pinatuzumab vedotin
 Lifastuzumab vedotin
 Brentuximab vedotin
 Glembatumumab vedotin
 Tisotumab vedotin
 Indusatumab vedotin (MLN-0264) in phase II trials

See also
 Seattle Genetics
 Monomethyl auristatin F

References

Mitotic inhibitors